Pálné Veres (née: Hermin Beniczky, 1815–1895) was a Hungarian teacher and feminist, known for promoting women's rights, opening the first secondary school for women in Hungary and founding the Hungarian National Association for Women's Education.

Life 
Pálné Veres was born on December 13, 1815 in Lázi, then part of the Austrian Empire. Her original name was Hermin Beniczky. After her marriage, according to Hungarian tradition, she wore the name of her husband Pál Veres ("né" means 'wife of'). Her father Pál Beniczky was a Protestant landowner from a noble family of Nograd, while her mother Karolina Sturmann came from a family, which became wealthy through commerce. Márton Sturmann, the grandfather of Veres was a Hungarian patriot and dedicated Protestant. When she reached adulthood she moved to Pest, where she met and befriended the writer Imre Madách. She eventually died in Pest on September 28, 1895.

Activism 
Palne Veres, an educated woman herself, founded the first school of secondary education for girls in Hungary in 1869. Her philosophy was that girls should be taught to be self-sufficient, and to learn to appreciate fine culture while avoiding a tendency towards self-indulgence in luxury, which could ruin even the most affluent families. Girls were to be taught to be the most direct representative of God in their future married lives, and to embody Christian ideals in their behaviour.

The school itself was divided into 11 classes: four elementary level, four intermediary level, and three superior level. The curriculum for the superior classes included: Religious instruction; Hungarian Language; Hungarian Literature; Aesthetics; Pedagogy; Anthropology and Psychology; Logic; History of Civilization (above all, as it related to women); Algebra and Geometry; German language; French language; Manual arts; Vocal and Instrumental Music; Gymnastics; Mathematics and Stereometry; Drawing.

Palne Veres was disappointed at the high rate of departure of the students before the superior level. The upper bourgeoisie and aristocratic families whose daughters were her students did not see a practical use for their daughters to attend beyond a certain age. The superior-level classes were viewed as only useful for young women who intended to become school teachers themselves. Palne Veres did succeed in influencing the upper bourgeoisie and aristocracy towards acknowledging the benefits of education in general for children of both sexes.

References 

1815 births
1895 deaths
Hungarian feminists
19th-century Hungarian people